"Over You" is a song by American girl-group Girlicious, from their second album, Rebuilt. It was written by August Rigo. It officially impacted Canadian radio on December 25, 2009. It was digitally released to iTunes Canada on January 5, 2010. "Over You" is also the first official single not to feature former member Tiffanie Anderson who parted back in 2009 citing personal differences between the girls. The song was later scrapped as a single to be replaced by "Maniac".

Promotion
The song was officially added to Canadian radio on December 25, 2009. The song was performed for the first time on March 12 at CHUM FM FanFest 2010.

Chart performance
Despite not receiving a physical release the single managed to chart on the Canadian Hot 100 where it was listed for 11 weeks. The first week of release the single reached its peak of 52 solely from digital downloads. "Over You" is also the first song by the group to be listed on the "Canadian National Airplay List".

Music video
Originally a music video was planned, but with the release of  "Maniac" in April 2010, the video was officially scrapped.

Chart positions

Radio date and release history

References

2010 singles
2010 songs
Girlicious songs
Songs written by August Rigo
Songs written by Alex Lacasse
Universal Music Group singles